The Estados Sucre gecko (Gonatodes seigliei) is a species of lizard in the family Sphaerodactylidae. The species is endemic to Venezuela.

Etymology
The specific name, seigliei, is in honor of Cuban-Venezuelan micropaleontologist George Alfredo Seiglie (1926–1988).

Geographic range
G. seigliei is found in the Venezuelan states of Monagas and Sucre.

Habitat

Description
G. seigliei is a small gecko, characterized by granular rostral and labial scales, black vermiculations on the yellowish head and the dorsum, and the presence of a pair of small ocelli (eye spots) located very anteriorly, above the shoulders.

Reproduction
G. seigliei is oviparous.

References

Further reading
Donoso-Barros R (1966). "Dos nuevos Gonatodes de Venezuela". Publicaciones Ocasionales, Museo Nacional de Historia Natural, Santiago de Chile 11: 1–32. (Gonatodes seigliei, new species, p. 11). (in Spanish).
Rivas GA, Molina CR, Ugueto GN, Barros TR, Barrio-Amorós CL, Kok PJR (2012). "Reptiles of Venezuela: an updated and commented checklist". Zootaxa 3211: 1–64.
Rösler H (2000). "Kommentierte Liste der rezent, subrezent und fossil bekannten Geckotaxa (Reptilia: Gekkonomorpha)". Gekkota 2: 28–153. (Gonatodes seigliei, p. 84). (in German).

Gonatodes
Reptiles described in 1966